Eyreton, originally known as Eyretown, is a small village in the Canterbury region of New Zealand's South Island. It is named after Edward John Eyre, who at one time was the lieutenant governor of the South Island (then known as New Munster). It is a rural village located to the west of Kaiapoi, near the north bank of the Waimakariri River.

Although a branch line railway called the Eyreton Branch existed, it never actually ran through Eyreton; its route from Kaiapoi to West Eyreton passed north of the village.

Demographics
Eyreton is part of the wider Swannanoa-Eyreton statistical area.

References

External links
2001 census data and community profile

Waimakariri District
Populated places in Canterbury, New Zealand